Robert Fulford Ruttan,  (July 15, 1856 – February 19, 1930) was a Canadian chemist and university professor.

Biography
Born in Newburgh, Upper Canada, the son of Dr. Allan Ruttan, a physician, and Caroline Smith, Ruttan's family moved to Napanee around 1863. He received a Bachelor of Arts in natural science degree in 1881 from the University of Toronto. He received his M.D. in 1884 from McGill University, where he also participated in the establishment of the zeta psi fraternity. He never practiced medicine, but rather did postgraduate studies in organic chemistry with August Wilhelm von Hofmann at the University of Berlin.

Returning to Canada in 1886, he was appointed a lecturer in chemistry in the faculty of medicine at McGill. In 1891, he became professor. In 1912, he became director of McGill's newly unified chemistry program, a position he occupied until 1928. He was dean of graduate studies and research from 1924 to 1928.

In 1896, he was made a Fellow of the Royal Society of Canada and served as its president from 1919 to 1920. In 1920, he helped found the Canadian Institute of Chemistry.

A cricketer, yachtsman, and golfer, Ruttan was president of the Royal Canadian Golf Association in 1907. In 1906, he served on Canada’s first national Olympic organization, the Central Olympic Committee.

In 1914, he was awarded an honorary Doctor of Science degree by the University of Toronto.

He died in Montreal in 1930.

Notes

References
 
 

1856 births
1930 deaths
Canadian chemists
Canadian university and college faculty deans
Fellows of the Royal Society of Canada
McGill University Faculty of Medicine alumni
Academic staff of McGill University
People from Lennox and Addington County
University of Toronto alumni